is a Japanese anime series by Tele-Cartoon Japan. It was originally created by Noboru Kawasaki (art) and Takashi Ishibashi (story). Kawasaki also served as the character designer for both anime series.

Plot
The Skyers 5 are a secret police group who fight an international crime organization.

Characters
 Kyousuke Maki as Captain/S1
 Setsuo Kawai as Polka/S2
 Youko Kuri as Yuri/S3
 Takuzou Kamiyama as Samson/S4
 Shūsei Nakamura as Taro Hayabusa/S5
 Masaoki Takato as Ghost

References

Shueisha franchises